The following lists events that happened during 2015 in Greece.

Incumbents

Events

January
 January 3 – Former Prime Minister George Papandreou announces the formation of a new party, Movement of Democratic Socialists, threatening to push the long-dominant PASOK under the election threshold.
 January 5 – A Libyan warplane bombs a Greek-operated oil tanker anchored offshore the city of Derna, killing two sailors, one Greek and one Romanian. The Greek government condemned what it called an "unprovoked and cowardly" attack and demanded an investigation and punishment for those responsible.
 January 17 – Greek anti-terror police arrest four people in Athens in alleged relation to the January 15 failed terrorist plot to kill police officers in Belgium.
 January 25 – A legislative election takes place to elect all 300 members to the Hellenic Parliament in accordance with the constitution. The formerly ruling Greek conservatives concede the election. Preliminary results indicate that SYRIZA will fall just short of an absolute majority. Eventually SYRIZA takes 36.34% of the votes.
 January 27 – The First Cabinet of Alexis Tsipras is sworn in (two-party coalition of SYRIZA and ANEL).

February 
 February 11 – The Greek Coast Guard rescues all 22 crewmen from a Cyprus -flagged vessel Good Faith that ran aground on the Greek island of Andros during a storm in the Aegean Sea.
 February 18 – The Hellenic Parliament elects Prokopis Pavlopoulos as the new President of Greece.

June 
 June 11 – NERIT shuts down and is replaced by its predecessor, ERT

July 

 July 5 – A referendum on whether Greece should accept the bailout conditions proposed by the European Commission, the International Monetary Fund and the European Central Bank is held. The bailout conditions are rejected with a majority of 61.31%.

August 
 August 20 – The prime minister Alexis Tsipras resigns.
 August 27 –  Vassiliki Thanou is sworn as caretaker prime minister to lead the country until the end of the snap elections scheduled for 20 September.

September 
 September 20 – Legislative elections take place and Syriza led by Alexis Tsipras takes the most votes.
 September 21 – Alexis Tsipras is sworn in as Prime Minister of Greece for second time.
 September 23 – The Second Cabinet of Alexis Tsipras is sworn in (re-formation of the coalition of Syriza and ANEL).

November 
 November 17 – The 6.5  Lefkada earthquake shook the area with a maximum Mercalli intensity of VII (Very strong), killing two and injuring four.

References

 
2010s in Greece
Greece
Greece
Years of the 21st century in Greece